Star "The Rock of Niue" Tauasi (born ~1975) is a Niuean boxer. He competed for Niue at the 2002 and 2006 Commonwealth Games, and at the 2003 South Pacific Games in Suva, Fiji, winning a bronze.

Tauasi took up boxing after injuring his knee playing rugby league.

Boxing
	1999 - Auckland Amateur Super Heavyweight Boxing Champion.
	1999 – New Zealand Amateur Super Heavyweight Boxing Champion.
	2000 - NZ Rep. Bronze Medallist. Oceania Boxing Championships & Olympic Trials AIS, Canberra
	2001 - North Island, NZ, Golden Gloves Amateur Super Heavyweight Boxing Champion.
   2002 - Represented Niue at Manchester Commonwealth Games - Knocked out "Demolition" David Turner (Australia) - Rnd 2, but lost by Majority Points Decision to eventual Gold Medal winner, David Dolan, from England.
	2002 - Fought & stopped current NZ Amateur Super Heavyweight Boxing Champion Rnd 3
	2003 - Bronze Medallist - South Pacific Games, Suva, Fiji.
	2003 - Lost Majority Points Decision to current Amateur Super Heavyweight Boxing, Australia, Justin Whitehead of Victoria
	2006 - Represented Niue at Melbourne Commonwealth Games. Lost by 1 point to Ghana, disputed but unsuccessful.

References

External links

https://www.youtube.com/watch?v=1PoA1IhkPqo

Year of birth missing (living people)
Living people
Niuean male boxers
Super-heavyweight boxers